Calamba station is a railway station located on the South Main Line in Laguna, Philippines. It is one of two railway stations in the city and it is a major station on the line, serving as the junction between the South Main Line and the old Calamba–Batangas branch line which used to connect to Batangas City. It is also envisioned to be the terminus of the Commuter Express when rehabilitation work is complete. The station was first opened on January 24, 1909.

Major landmarks near the station include SM City Calamba, the Calamba Central Bus and Jeepney Terminal, and the Calamba Medical Center.

Hybrid Electric Train

The Hybrid Electric Train headquarters is also located at Calamba station departure, built by Department of Science and Technology's Metals Industry Research and Development Center, It is the main station of the Hybrid Electric Train (HET), runs from Calamba to San Pablo in Laguna to the south on May 6, 2019. The train project began 2012 and built in year 2014–2015. The project was introduced to the public and the media in June 2016.

References

Philippine National Railways stations
Railway stations in Laguna (province)
Buildings and structures in Calamba, Laguna